"Take Me Away" is a song by British DJ S.K.T featuring guest vocals from English singer Rae. It heavily samples the lyrics of the song "Take Me Away", by The Final Cut and True Faith from 1989. It was released on 31 May 2015 as a digital download in the United Kingdom through Atlantic Records.

Charts

Release history

References

2015 singles
British dance songs
2015 songs
Atlantic Records singles